Barry Dean may refer to:

 Barry Dean (ice hockey) (born 1955), Canadian ice hockey player
 Barry Dean (songwriter) (born 1967), American country and pop music songwriter